Sak (also known as Cak, Chak, or Tsak) is a Sino-Tibetan language of the Sal branch spoken in Bangladesh and Myanmar.

Geographical distribution
Cak is spoken in Bangladesh by about 3,000 people and in Rakhine State, Burma by about 1,000 people according to Ethnologue. In Bangladesh, Cak is spoken in Baishari, Naikhyongchari, and
Dochari (Huziwara 2018). In Rakhine State, Burma, Sak is spoken in Maungdaw, Buthidaung, Rathedaung, and Mrauk U townships (Huziwara 2018). The Baishari dialect is the most conservative one (Huziwara 2018).

According to Ethnologue, in Bangladesh, Chak is spoken in 14 villages in:
Chittagong Division: Baishari, Bandarban, Bishar Chokpra
Southern Naikhongchari area in the Arakan Blue Mountains

Phonology

Consonants 

 Sounds /tsʰ, kʰ, w/ mainly occur from loanwords.
/ts, tsʰ, dz/ is also heard as [tʃ, tʃʰ, dʒ] among other dialects.
[ɲ] occurs as a realization of the consonant sequence /ŋj/.

Vowels 

 [ə] only occurs in minor syllables or as a result of vowel reduction of /a/.

Further reading
 
 
Glottolog 2.7 - Sak. (n.d.). Retrieved February 12, 2016 
 
Huziwara, Keisuke. 2002. “Chakku-go no onsei ni kansuru koosatu” [A phonetic analysis of Cak]. Kyoto University Linguistic Research [Kyooto Daigaku Gengogaku Kenkyuu] 21:217–73.
Huziwara, Keisuke. 2008. Chakku-go no kizyutu gengogakuteki kenkyuu [A descriptive linguistic study of the Cak language]. Doctoral dissertation, Kyoto University. lix + 942 pp.
 
Huziwara, Keisuke. 2010. “Cak prefixes.” In Dai Zhongming and James A. Matisoff, eds., Zang-Mian-yu yanjiu sishi nian [Forty Years of Sino-Tibetan Studies], pp. 130–45. Harbin: Heilongjiang University Press.
 
Thurgood, G., & LaPolla, R. J. (2003). The Sino-Tibetan languages.
Voegelin, C. F., & Voegelin, F. M. (1965). Languages of the world: Sino-Tibetan fascicle five. Anthropological Linguistics, 7(6), 1-58. Retrieved February 12, 2016

References

External links
Samples of Spoken Sak/Chak from a Missionary Project 

Sal languages
Languages of Myanmar
Languages of Bangladesh